Pennyrile State Forest is a state forest in Christian County, Kentucky, United States. It contains Pennyrile Forest State Resort Park and borders Lake Beshear. It is managed for sustainable timber production.

External links
Official Page

Kentucky state forests
Protected areas established in 1930
Protected areas of Christian County, Kentucky